Lubbockichthys is a genus of ray-finned fish from the Indo-Pacific region which belongs to the subfamily Pseudoplesiopinae, part of the family Pseudochromidae, the dottybacks. The species in this genus have small cycloid scales throughout their lives; some of their head bones have a weakly honeycombed surface; and the parietal bone encloses the rear section of the supratemporal laterosensory canal.

The name of this genus honours the Cambridge University ichthyologist, Roger Lubbock (1951-1981) in recognition of his work on the taxonomy of the subfamily Pseudoplesiopinae.

Species
Three species are currently classified in the genus Lubbockichthys:

 Lubbockichthys multisquamatus (G. R. Allen, 1987) (Fine-scaled dottyback)
 Lubbockichthys myersi A.C.Gill & Edwards, 2006
 Lubbockichthys tanakai A.C.Gill & Senou, 2002 (Tanaka's dottyback)

References

Pseudoplesiopinae